Thomas Fahn (born 1962) is an American voice actor. He is known for his portrayals as Sho Fukamachi in Guyver and Agumon in the Digimon franchise.

Personal life 
His sister and brother, Melissa Fahn and Jonathan Fahn, respectively and wife, Dorothy Elias-Fahn, are also voice actors. His brother, Mike Fahn, is a jazz trombone player. Fahn is married to fellow actress Dorothy Elias-Fahn. They have one daughter.

Filmography

Animation
 What a Cartoon! - Woim

Live action
 Big Bad Beetleborgs - Firecat (voice)
 Masked Rider - Dread Dragon (voice, uncredited)
 Mighty Morphin Power Rangers - Skelerena (voice, uncredited)
 Power Rangers: Lost Galaxy - Chameliac, Green Shark (voice)
 Power Rangers: Turbo - Count Nocturne, The Demon Racers, Wicked Wisher (voices, uncredited)
 VR Troopers - Trooper Terminator, Dream Master (voices)

Film
 Ice Age: The Meltdown - Stu, Male Ox (voice)
 The Adventures of Panda Warrior - Bruce Barkley
 The Even Stevens Movie - Gotcha! Father

Video games
 Digimon Rumble Arena - Agumon
 EverQuest II - Dirk Vagrin, Farnsby Dunwroth, Zenomaron Croosinaden, Ubani, Watchman Firececry, Armsdealer Froptub

Dubbing roles

Anime
 Black Heaven - Michael Sato
 Black Magic M-66 - Ferris's Friend
 Bleach - Kano, Mizuiro Kojima
 Blood: The Last Vampire - Teacher
 The Big O - Eugene Grant
 Cowboy Bebop - Rocco Bonnaro
 Cosmowarrior Zero - Toichiro
 Digimon Adventure/Digimon Adventure 02 - Agumon, Digmon, Submarimon, Mantarou Inoue, Various
 Digimon Data Squad - Boxer Hayase Harris, DemiDevimon #3, Thug, Professor
 Digimon Tamers - Dolphin, Jijimon
 Digimon Frontier - Airdramon, Datamon, Centarumon, Pteramon
 Flint the Time Detective - Leafy, Super Ninja
 Giant Robo - Prof. Franken Von Folger
 Great Teacher Onizuka - Mutoh
 Guyver - Sho Fukamachi
 Hunter × Hunter 2011 series - Buhara (uncredited), Kiriko (Eps. 2, 13)
 JoJo's Bizarre Adventure - Wired Beck
 JoJo's Bizarre Adventure: Stardust Crusaders - Centerfold (uncredited)
 Kekkaishi - Daigo Todoroki, Masahiko Tsukijigoaka, Youkyokusai
 Kyo Kara Maoh! - Josak Guiere, Gunter Von Christ (Season 2)
 Marmalade Boy - Sakai
 Naruto Shippuden - Natori
 Outlanders - Tetsuya Wakatsuki (L.A. Hero dub)
 Reign: The Conqueror - Ptolemy (Eps. 5–13)
 Shinzo - Hakuba
 The Super Dimension Century Orguss - Kei Katsuragi
 Tenchi Muyo! GXP - Alan

Live action
 Violetta - Rafa Palmer

Film
 Digimon: The Movie - Agumon, Digmon
 Digimon: Revenge of Diaboromon - Agumon
 Digimon Adventure tri. - Agumon
 Digimon Adventure: Last Evolution Kizuna - Agumon
 Ice Age: The Meltdown - Stu, Male Ox
 NiNoKuni - Zeelok Doctor 2

Video games
 Digimon ReArise - Agumon
 Digimon Rumble Arena - Agumon
 Twin Mirror - Walter

References

External links

1962 births
Living people
American male video game actors
American male voice actors
20th-century American male actors
21st-century American male actors